Sundown Trail is a lost 1919 American silent Western film directed by Rollin S. Sturgeon and starring Monroe Salisbury. It was produced and released by the Universal Film Manufacturing Company.

Cast
 Monroe Salisbury as "Quiet" Carter
 Clyde Fillmore as Velvet Eddy
 Alice Claire Elliott as The Girl
 Beatrice Dominguez as Mexican Girl
 Carl Stockdale as The Planter

References

External links
 
 
 Lantern slide (Wayback Machine)

1919 films
1919 Western (genre) films
Lost Western (genre) films
Universal Pictures films
Lost American films
Films directed by Rollin S. Sturgeon
1919 lost films
Silent American Western (genre) films
1910s American films